Richard Tyrrell (c.1545 – c.1632) was an Anglo-Irish Lord of Norman ancestry who was a commander of rebel Irish forces in the Irish Nine Years War.

Early life
He was probably born in Spain in 1545, the son of Phillip Tyrrell and his Spanish wife. As head of the Tyrrell family he became the Lord of Fartullagh, a barony in south Westmeath based on the village of Tyrrellspass, a position the Tyrrells had held since the time of Henry II. He saw military service for the English-backed Crown forces in Ireland but was falsely accused in 1565 by the Earl of Kildare of the murder of Garrot Nugent, son of the Baron of Delvin. As a result, he subsequently allied himself with the Irish cause.

Battle of Tyrrellspass
During the Nine Years War, which commenced in 1594, he became a commander of the rebel forces in Leinster under Hugh O'Neill, Earl of Tyrone. In 1597 the Crown forces commenced a new campaign, involving a three-pronged attack on Ulster, aiming to link up in Ballyshannon. One force under Robert Barnewall, with 1000 men from the Pale, was ambushed by Tyrrell, with 300 men, and his fellow commander Piers Lacy at Tyrrellspass. The Crown forces were cut to pieces with few survivors. Tyrrell was afterwards made Colonel General of O'Neill's forces in Munster.

Later life
In 1600, Lord Mountjoy was sent to Ireland by Queen Elizabeth to quell the rebellion. He besieged Tyrrell at his headquarters at "Tyrrell’s Island", the exact location of which is not known. Tyrrell escaped and joined O'Neill in Ulster. The rebels later headed south to join up with a Spanish army landing at Kinsale in County Cork, but were defeated in 1601 by Crown forces in the area. O'Neill retired to Ulster and Tyrrell decided to submit to George Carew, Lord President of Ulster, after which he retired to Cavan.

He was responsible for building the castle in Tyrrellspass.

References

Irish revolutionaries
Irish soldiers in the Nine Years' War
People of the Nine Years' War (Ireland)